Valley of the Dolls is an American drama series that aired in Syndication that ran from June 13 until September 9, 1994, and ran for 65 episodes with a running time of around 30 minutes per episode.

Overview
A 1990s television adaption of the 1966 novel Valley of the Dolls shows the lives of various glamorous women living in Southern California.

Principal cast
Sally Kirkland as Helen Lawson
Colleen Morris as Jennifer North
Melissa De Sousa as Neely O'Hara
Sharon Case as Anne Welles
Warren Burton as Mitch Henry
Michael Paul Chan as Rick Chen
Kamar de los Reyes as Ray Ariaz
Cameron Hall as Billy Shreiber
Lisa Howard as Caitlin North
Carol Lawrence as Bernice Stein
Scott Marlowe as Michael Burke
John O'Hurley as Allen Cooper
Jim Pirri as Jean-Claude
Tom Reilly as Peter D'Allesio
Mik Scriba as Gordon North
Milton Selzer as Manny Henry
Kevin Spirtas as Tim Burke
David Stratton as Dennis Ulander

References

External links

1990s American drama television series
1994 American television series debuts
1994 American television series endings
Television series by New World Television
English-language television shows
Television shows based on American novels
First-run syndicated television programs in the United States
American television soap operas